The Custer Military Trail Historic Archeological District is a national historic district consisting of  located in Billings and Golden Valley Counties in North Dakota. The district includes five historic sites associated with the Plains Indian War from 1864 to 1876.

The historic sites include Initial Rock, a site where George Custer's 7th Cavalry Regiment camped on May 28, 1876, en route to Little Bighorn.  Two privates in Custer's regiment, W. C. Williams and F. Neely, carved their initials into a sandstone boulder at the site.  The district also includes two additional military campsites, the site of the Battle of the Badlands, and portions of a military supply trail. The district was listed on the National Register of Historic Places in 2009.  The district has five contributing sites.

References

Transportation in Billings County, North Dakota
Archaeological sites on the National Register of Historic Places in North Dakota
Transportation in Golden Valley County, North Dakota
Historic districts on the National Register of Historic Places in North Dakota
National Register of Historic Places in Golden Valley County, North Dakota
Great Sioux War of 1876
Conflict sites on the National Register of Historic Places
National Register of Historic Places in Billings County, North Dakota
Military Trail
Trails and roads in the American Old West
Military roads
Roads and trails on the National Register of Historic Places in North Dakota
1864 establishments in Dakota Territory